The 1992 Vienna Cup took place from September 24 through 27, 1992. Skaters competed in the disciplines of men's singles, ladies' singles, and ice dancing.

Results

Men

Ladies

Ice dancing

References
 ladies' results

Karl Schäfer Memorial
Karl Schafer Memorial, 1992
Karl Schafer Memorial
Karl Schafer Memorial